Batowice  is a village in the administrative district of Gmina Zielonki, within Kraków County, Lesser Poland Voivodeship, in southern Poland. Batowice is also the name of a neighbourhood within the city of Kraków, part of Mistrzejowice district.

References

Villages in Kraków County